Haidar Sabah Hassan  (born 15 March 1986 in Iraq) is a former Iraq football player, who is currently assistant coach of Al-Sinaat Al-Kahrabaiya. He was part of Iraq B team in the 2007 King's Cup. Haidar Sabah is the nephew of Falah Hassan

Honours

Club
Erbil SC
2007–08 Iraqi Premier League: Champion
Al-Zawraa
2003 Iraqi Elite Cup: Champion
2005–06 Iraqi Premier League: Champion
2010–11 Iraqi Premier League: Champion
2015–16 Iraqi Premier League: Champion
2016–17 Iraq FA Cup: Champion
2017 Iraqi Super Cup: Champion
2017–18 Iraqi Premier League: Champion

Country 

 2006 Asian Games Silver medallist.

External links
 profile on goalzz.com

Iraqi footballers
Al-Zawraa SC players
2004 AFC Asian Cup players
Living people
1986 births
Amanat Baghdad players
Asian Games medalists in football
Footballers at the 2006 Asian Games
Asian Games silver medalists for Iraq
Association football midfielders
Medalists at the 2006 Asian Games
Iraq international footballers